East Broadway Run Down is an album by jazz saxophonist Sonny Rollins recorded in 1966 and released in 1967 by Impulse Records, his last album before industry pressures led him to take a six-year hiatus. The album represents one of his more notable experiments with free jazz, according to The New Grove Dictionary of Jazz illustrating "the furthest extent to which he incorporated noise elements into his playing". It has been critically described as among his 60s "jewels".

Initially released on Impulse! Records, the album has been reissued many times on CD and LP by Impulse!, MCA, Universal International and GRP.

Track listing
Except where otherwise noted, all compositions by Sonny Rollins.

"East Broadway Run Down" – 20:27
"Blessing in Disguise" – 12:27
"We Kiss in a Shadow" (Oscar Hammerstein II, Richard Rodgers) – 5:40

Personnel

Performance
Sonny Rollins – tenor saxophone
Freddie Hubbard – trumpet (track 1 only)
Jimmy Garrison – bass
Elvin Jones – drums

Production
Bob Thiele – producer, photography
Rudy Van Gelder – engineer
Nat Hentoff – liner notes
Charles Stewart – photography, cover photo
Robert Flynn – artwork, cover design
Joe Lebow – liner design
Mel Cheren – artwork, cover painting
Vartan – art direction
Viceroy – artwork
DZN – repackaging design

References

Sonny Rollins albums
1966 albums
Impulse! Records albums
Albums produced by Bob Thiele
Albums recorded at Van Gelder Studio